The 1980–81 Wichita State Shockers men's basketball team represented Wichita State University in the 1980–81 NCAA Division I men's basketball season. They played their home games at the University of Wichita Field House. They were in their 36th season as a member of the Missouri Valley Conference and 75th season overall. They were led by head coach Gene Smithson in his 3rdseason at the school. They finished the season 26–7, 12–4 in Missouri Valley play to finish in first place. They received a bid to the 1981 NCAA Tournament and advanced to the regional finals before falling to LSU.

Roster

Schedule and results

|-
!colspan=12 style=""| Regular season

|-
!colspan=12 style=""| MVC tournament

|-
!colspan=9 style="" | 1981 NCAA tournament

Rankings

Awards and honors
Antoine Carr – AP Honorable Mention All-American
Cliff Levingston – AP Honorable Mention All-American

References

Wichita State Shockers men's basketball seasons
Wichita State
Wichita State
Shock
Shock